Wildstyle is a complicated and intricate form of graffiti. Due to its complexity, it is often very hard to read by people who are not familiar with it. Usually, this form of graffiti incorporates interwoven and overlapping letters and shapes. It may include arrows, spikes, and other decorative elements depending on the technique used. The numerous layers and shapes make this style extremely difficult to produce homogeneously, which is why developing an original style in this field is seen as one of the greatest artistic challenges to a graffiti writer. Wildstyle pieces are the most complex form of piece ("masterpiece") lettering, above both "burners" and "tags."

Styles 
Wildstyle commonly includes a set of arrows, curves and letters which have been so transformed as to be rendered arcane to the eyes of non-graffiti artists. It has also been common practice to incorporate 3D elements into the pieces. Letter structures are therefore rendered to add depth of visual perception of the work. Many artists have different elements to add to their wildstyle that gain that writer a good deal of respect within the graffiti scene, especially if one creates his or her own style and stays original and creative. Veteran artists tend to go for more complicated forms of wildstyle in which the types are hard to read but broad in creativity. Getting one's style mastered is key to achieving this success.

History of the term "Wildstyle"
The term "wildstyle" was popularized by the Wild Style graffiti crew formed by Tracy 168 of the Bronx. Formerly a street gang with over 500 members, the Bronx-based Wild Style crew is still active. Members include the founder Tracy 168, Cope2, T-Kid 170, Lava I&II, Taki 183, Daze, Comet, Blade, Futura 2000, Dan Plasma, Jimmy Ha-Ha and Yip. Complex and elaborate graffiti writing had been called numerous terms such as "mechanical letters." It was founded by Rif, Phase II and Stan 153. Kase II later introduced "computer-rock". The stylistic approach advanced at the same time Wild Style crew grew large and spread throughout New York City. So many members executed the complex style that eventually the crew's name was associated with it.

External links
Subway Art online
Graffiti glossary
FatCap, Worldwide graffiti blog
Streetpins.com - Graffiti Community with more than 100.000 Photos
  Wildstyle Graffiti as Artwork
http://burnerzgroupaustralia.wetpaint.com

Notes

Graffiti and unauthorised signage